Geophis nephodrymus is a snake of the colubrid family. It is endemic to Honduras.

References

Geophis
Snakes of North America
Reptiles of Honduras
Endemic fauna of Honduras
Reptiles described in 2006